Constantinos Markou (born on 27 March 1988 in Limassol) is a Cypriot footballer who plays for Ayia Napa.

References

1988 births
Living people
Cypriot footballers
Aris Limassol FC players
Ayia Napa FC players

Association football midfielders